Acer sinopurpurascens is an Asian species of maple. It is native to southern China (Anhui, Hubei, Jiangxi, Zhejiang).

Acer sinopurpurascens is a deciduous tree up to 10 meters tall with brownish-gray bark. It is dioecious, meaning that male and female flowers are on separate trees. Leaves are non-compound, up to 14 cm wide and 8 cm across, thin and papery, usually with 5 lobes but sometimes with only 3. Flowers are purple, unlike the green flowers of most maples.

References

sinopurpurascens
Plants described in 1931
Flora of China
Dioecious plants